Golden hat can refer to:
Golden hat - a set of four conical shaped golden hats dating to between 1400 BC and 800 BC
Golden Hat Trophy - awarded to the winner of the Red River Shootout college football game and now one of three trophies awarded after the game